The Teteriv is a right tributary of the Dnieper River in Ukraine. It has a length of 365 km and a drainage basin of 15,300 km².

In the underflow the valley of the Teteriv in Polissia on up to 4 km, the width of the river widens  up to 40-90 meter, before it flows into the Dnieper.

The Teteriv is replenished predominantly by snow and rain. It usually freezes over from December to March.

Large cities located on the river are: Zhytomyr, the administrative center of the Zhytomyr Oblast, Korostyshiv, and Radomyshl.

Tributaries
The important tributaries of the river are 
Left: Syvka, Ibr, Budychyna, Oleshka, Lisova, Perebehla, Hodynka, Shyika, Bobrivka, Kyzhynka, Chervonyi, Krutyi Yar, Perlivka, Pobytivka, Lisova Kamyanka, Kalynivka, Berezyna, Ruda, Levcha, Myka, Hlukhivka, Mezherichka, Myroch, Vyrva, Irsha, Ravka, Huche, Zamochek, Parnia, Kropyvnia, Zhereva, Liubsha, Bolotna, Terniava, Khocheva
Right: Kobylykha, Teterivka, Chamyshel, Hremliaha, Tetynets, Hlybochok, Koshcha, Hnylopiat, Huiva, Rusiatynka, Dorohynka, Hnylyi Potik, Kokhanivka, Ivyanka, Krychanka, Velyki Lozy, Dubovets, Bilka, Kodra, Piskivka, Tal, Zdvyzh

References

Rivers of Kyiv Oblast
Rivers of Zhytomyr Oblast